SS Henry W. Grady was a Liberty ship built in the United States during World War II. She was named after Henry W. Grady, a journalist.

Construction
Henry W. Grady was laid down on 31 July 1943, under a Maritime Commission (MARCOM) contract, MC hull 1501, by J.A. Jones Construction, Brunswick, Georgia, and launched on 22 October 1943.

History
She was allocated to Wilmore Steamship Company, on 30 October 1943. On 9 May 1946, she was laid up in the National Defense Reserve Fleet (NDRF) in the James River Group, Lee Hall, Virginia. On 19 May 1952, she was laid up in the NDRF in Beaumont, Texas. On 22 June 1971, she was sold to Consolidated Steel Corporation, for $42,000, for scrapping. She was delivered on 21 July 1971.

References

Bibliography

 
 
 
 
 

 

Liberty ships
Ships built in Brunswick, Georgia
1943 ships
James River Reserve Fleet
Beaumont Reserve Fleet